Bones for the King is an album by trombonist Dicky Wells which was recorded in 1958 and released on the Felsted label.

Reception

Scott Yanow of AllMusic states: "There is some good swing-based music to be heard throughout this album but nothing essential occurs".

Track listing
All compositions by Dicky Wells except where noted.
 "Bones for the King" – 6:36
 "Sweet Daddy Spo-de-o" – 7:26
 "You Took My Heart" (Skip Hall) – 6:01
 "Hello Smack!" (Buddy Tate) – 6:20
 "Come and Get It" – 8:04
 "Stan's Dance" (Buck Clayton) – 6:35

Personnel
Dicky Wells – trombone
Buck Clayton – trumpet (tracks 4-6)
Vic Dickenson, George Matthews, Benny Morton – trombone (tracks 1-3)
Rudy Rutherford – clarinet, baritone saxophone (tracks 4-6)
Buddy Tate – tenor saxophone, baritone saxophone (tracks 4-6)
Skip Hall – piano, organ
Everett Barksdale – guitar (tracks 4-6)
Major Holley – bass
Jo Jones – drums

References

Dicky Wells albums
1958 albums
Felsted Records albums